"When It All Falls Apart" is the third single released from Australian pop music duo the Veronicas' debut studio album, The Secret Life of... (2005), on 20 March 2006. "When It All Falls Apart" charted within the Australian Singles Chart top 20 for 14 weeks and has been certified gold for sales over 35,000 units in Australia. In the United States, the song served as the duo's second single in June 2006. It was to be released in the United Kingdom as their first single in March 2007 but was later canceled; "Untouched" was released as their debut UK single instead in 2009.

Music video
The music video for "When It All Falls Apart" features the Veronicas waking up in their home to a party they had the night before. While cleaning, they have flashbacks of the party to show their house got trashed, having a crocodile going around the house. At the end of their video, they sit outside and sing the rest of their song.

Track listing
 "When It All Falls Apart" – 3:15
 "Heavily Broken" (live) – 4:23
 "Everything I'm Not" (Jason Nevins remix edit) – 3:30

Chart performance
"When It All Falls Apart" peaked at number seven in Australia and spent seven weeks inside the top 10. It reached the same position in New Zealand and entered the top 20 in the Flanders region of Belgium.

Weekly charts

Year-end charts

Certifications

Release history

References

The Veronicas songs
2005 songs
2006 singles
Music videos directed by Robert Hales
Sire Records singles
Song recordings produced by Billy Steinberg
Song recordings produced by Dr. Luke
Songs written by Billy Steinberg
Songs written by Jessica Origliasso
Songs written by Josh Alexander
Songs written by Lisa Origliasso